Spintheridae is a family of marine polychaete worms with a single genus, Spinther, containing these species:
 Spinther alaskensis Hartman, 1948
 Spinther arcticus (M. Sars, 1851) (includes Spinther miniaceus Grube, 1860)Spinther australiensis Augener, 1913
 Spinther citrinus (Stimpson, 1854)Spinther ericinus Yamamoto & Imajima, 1985Spinther hystrix Uschakov, 1950
 Spinther japonicus Imajima and Hartman, 1964
 Spinther oniscoides Johnston, 1845Spinther sagamiensis Imajima, 2003Spinther usarpia Hartman, 1967
 Spinther vegae Augener, 1928 (includes Spinther wireni'' Hartman, 1948)

The animal lives as a symbiont on sponges.

Johnston's paper does not explain the choice of the name, but ancient Greek σπινθήρ means "spark." In images of the living animal, it appears to be surrounded by a cloud of pinpoints of light.

References

Polychaetes
Taxa named by George Johnston (naturalist)